Sound As Ever may refer to:

 Sound As Ever (You Am I album), 1993
 Sound As Ever (The Burritos album), 2011